is a subway station on the Sendai Subway Namboku Line in Aoba-ku, Sendai, Miyagi Prefecture, Japan.

Lines

Station layout
Dainohara Station is an underground station with a single island platform serving two tracks.

Platforms

History
Dainohara Station was opened on 15 July 1987. Operations were suspended from 11 March 2011 to 29 April 2012 due to damage sustained by the 2011 Tōhoku earthquake and tsunami.

Passenger statistics
In fiscal 2015, the station was used by an average of 5,768 passengers daily.

Surrounding area
 Komatsushima Park
 Dainohara Woods Village Park
 Sendai City Literature Museum
 Tohoku Labour Disaster Hospital
 Sendai-Kita Post Office
 Sendai Dainohara Post Office

See also
 List of railway stations in Japan

References

External links

 

Railway stations in Miyagi Prefecture
Sendai Subway Namboku Line
Railway stations in Japan opened in 1987